The buff-throated tody-tyrant (Hemitriccus rufigularis) is a species of bird in the family Tyrannidae. It is found in Bolivia, Ecuador, and Peru. Its natural habitat is subtropical or tropical moist montane forests. It is threatened by habitat loss.

References

buff-throated tody-tyrant
Birds of the Yungas
buff-throated tody-tyrant
Taxonomy articles created by Polbot